Salani may refer to:

 Salani dialect, spoken in India
 Salani, Samoa, a village in Atua District, Samoa
 Salani, an Italian surname; notable people with the name include:
 Corso Salani (1961–2010), director and actor
 Leonardo Salani, rower
 Mario Salani (born 1966), yacht racer
 , an Italian publisher